Shohagi Union Higher secondary School is a higher secondary school in Ishwarganj Upazila, Mymensingh District, Bangladesh. It is a renowned school in Ishwarganj because of its historical background and academic performance. The school is located near Shohagi Bazar. It was established in 1955 and typically teaches about 1,500 students with a staff of about 35.

History
Shohagi Union Higher secondary School was established in 1955 by Nuruddin Ahmed, the first headmaster. Thereafter Md. Abul Kalam BA. B.ED. was the second headmaster of the school. It is a non-government high school and college.

Admission
Generally, admission is permitted in class vi and xi once a year. There is no eligibility for the admission test, and students with good performance in the admission test are usually admitted.

Tuition fee
As a half government high school, tuition fee is low compared to private school. Poor merit students can read for free. In each class, there are 2–3 class representative who deal with teachers and are known as class representatives. Class representatives are elected by the class with guidance of the class teacher.

School uniform
The school uniform was introduced in 1995, and consists of:
 Boys:
 Full sleeve white shirt
 Black color pants
 Girls:
 Navy blue skirt
 White sallower

Educational facilities
Educational facilities include a science laboratory, workshop, computer lab, covered gymnasium and library. Lessons on physics, chemistry, biology and computer are normally held in the science and computer laboratory.

Educationists
Mr. Md. Rezai Karim, retired Project Director, ADB Project, Department of Fisheries

References

High schools in Bangladesh
Schools in Mymensingh District
1955 establishments in East Pakistan